Frank DeMarco (born December 14, 1950) is a Canadian former professional ice hockey player.

DeMarco played 179 regular season games and 21 playoff games in International Hockey League (IHL) with the Des Moines Capitols and the Flint Generals. He was awarded the 1973–74 Gary F. Longman Memorial Trophy as the IHL Rookie of the Year.

Career statistics

Awards and honours

References

External links

1950 births
Living people
Baltimore Clippers players
Canadian ice hockey right wingers
Des Moines Capitols players
Flint Generals players
Michigan State Spartans men's ice hockey players
Omaha Knights (CHL) players
Tulsa Oilers (1964–1984) players
Sportspeople from Greater Sudbury
Canadian expatriate ice hockey players in the United States